Riwat Site 55 is an Upper Palaeolithic archaeological site in the Soan Valley, near the village of Rawat in Punjab, Pakistan. It is approximately 45,000 years old and shows human occupation in Pakistan about 45-68,000 years ago.

See also
 Riwat

References

Archaeological sites in Pakistan
Paleolithic sites